Steven Ellis Bowman (November 30, 1944 – November 17, 2017) was an American football halfback who played one season with the New York Giants of the National Football League (NFL). He was drafted by the New York Giants in the 15th round of the 1966 NFL Draft. He was also drafted by the Oakland Raiders in the 20th round of the 1966 AFL Draft. Bowman played college football at the University of Alabama and attended Pascagoula High School in Pascagoula, Mississippi.

References

External links
Just Sports Stats
College stats

1944 births
2017 deaths
Players of American football from Mississippi
American football halfbacks
Alabama Crimson Tide football players
New York Giants players
People from Pascagoula, Mississippi